Elatotrypes hoferi is a species of beetle in the family Cerambycidae, the only species in the genus Elatotrypes.

References

Callidiini